Dubenki or Dubyonki is the name of several rural localities in Russia:
Dubenki, Ivanovo Oblast, a selo in Ivanovo Oblast
Dubyonki, Republic of Mordovia, a selo in the Republic of Mordovia
Dubenki, name of several other rural localities